Which Way to the War is a failed pilot for a planned British television sitcom, which was written by David Croft and Jeremy Lloyd. The pilot episode originally aired on 19 August 1994. It was also Croft and Lloyd's only ITV sitcom and Croft's last World War II sitcom.

Plot
In the Western Desert of World War Two, a party of British "Desert Rats" soldiers and a party of Australian soldiers are holed up in a remote building, when an ambulance of Italian "nurses" arrive.

The pilot was badly received and was never developed into a series. The pilot was directed by Roy Gould who had worked for David Croft at the BBC.

Cast
 William Tapley as Cpl. Roy Muller
 Simon Baker Denny as Pte. Stan Hawke
 Terry John as Cpl. Tony Genaro
 Robert Hands as Pte. Jock Stewart
 Sarah Payne as Mara
 Nadia Sawalha as Lucia
 Elisabeth Bolognini as Little Anna
 Valeria Fabbri as Carla
 Amanda Weston as Theresa
 Jason Hall as Capt. Gregory Swift
 Martin Sadler as Able One Charlie

External links
 BBC Comedy Guide: Which Way To The War

ITV sitcoms
David Croft sitcoms
World War II television comedy series
1994 television films
1994 films
1994 television specials
English-language television shows
Military comedy television series
Television series by Yorkshire Television
Television pilots not picked up as a series